Vladan Đogatović (born 3 November 1984) is a Serbian professional footballer who plays as a goalkeeper for Icelandic club Grindavík.

Career
Đogatović started out at local club Javor Ivanjica, but failed to make his league debut. He instead spent some time on loan at Dragačevo Guča, Sloga Kraljevo, and Mladost Lučani. In the summer of 2010, Đogatović moved to Radnički Kragujevac. He also later played for Novi Pazar and Metalac Gornji Milanovac.

In the summer of 2014, Đogatović returned to Javor Ivanjica, helping them to promotion to the Serbian SuperLiga in the 2014–15 season. He made over 100 appearances in the top flight over the next three seasons, as the club suffered relegation back to the Serbian First League in the 2017–18 season.

In January 2019, Đogatović moved abroad for the first time and signed with Icelandic club Grindavík.

Honours
Sloga Kraljevo
 Serbian League West: 2008–09
Javor Ivanjica
 Serbian First League: 2007–08
 Serbian Cup: Runner-up 2015–16

References

External links
 
 
 

Association football goalkeepers
Expatriate footballers in Iceland
FK Javor Ivanjica players
FK Metalac Gornji Milanovac players
FK Mladost Lučani players
FK Novi Pazar players
FK Radnički 1923 players
FK Sloga Kraljevo players
Vladan Dogatović
People from Ivanjica
Serbian expatriate footballers
Serbian expatriate sportspeople in Iceland
Serbian First League players
Serbian footballers
Serbian SuperLiga players
1984 births
Living people